Martha Howe-Douglas (born 19 September 1980) is an English actress and writer.  She is a member of the British Horrible Histories troupe, in which she starred in the TV series Horrible Histories. She also starred in and co-created Yonderland and Ghosts. She also played receptionist Donna Parmar in the BBC One daytime soap Doctors.

Early life and education
Martha Howe-Douglas was born and raised in Moseley, a suburb of south Birmingham, England. She attended Edgbaston High School.

Career
Howe-Douglas graduated from RADA in 2003, in the same year she appeared in the Christmas Special of The Office, replacing Dawn as the receptionist at Wernham-Hogg.

From 24 April 2006 until 11 May 2007, Howe-Douglas played receptionist Donna Parmar in the BBC daytime soap opera Doctors. For her role as Donna, Howe-Douglas received nominations for Best Comedy Performance and Best Newcomer at the 2007 British Soap Awards.

In 2009, she landed one of the main multi-role parts on a new children's TV history sketch show programme, CBBC's Horrible Histories, where over five years / series, she played numerous characters including the queens Cleopatra, Elizabeth I, Boudicea and Victoria — see Horrible Histories for list of characters. In 2011, she appeared in The Proms, in a special live "Horrible Histories Big Prom Party" performance.

In 2013, she co-created, co-wrote and co-starred in Sky1's series Yonderland, and played lead character Debbie Maddox in all three series.

Other acting roles have included appearing in The Armstrong & Miller Show on BBC One and playing Flora Dies-Early in the hit radio comedy show Bleak Expectations as well as Lady Anne Woodstock in the radio show The Castle.

In 2018, she appeared in EastEnders as Annie Pritchard.

From 15 April 2019, Howe-Douglas co-wrote, produced and starred in the BBC sitcom Ghosts, which sees her reunited with the Horrible Histories cast.

Filmography

References

External links
 
 

Living people
English television actresses
English soap opera actresses
English radio actresses
People from Birmingham, West Midlands
Alumni of RADA
20th-century English actresses
21st-century English actresses
Year of birth missing (living people)